Bonvar Hoseyn (also Romanized as Bonvār Ḩoseyn and 'Benvār-e Ḩoseyn; also known as Bownvar-e Bozorg, Bunwar Buzurg, and Hoseyn Bozorg) is a village in Qeblehi Rural District, in the Central District of Dezful County, Khuzestan Province, Iran. At the 2006 census, its population was 674, in 139 families.

References 

Populated places in Dezful County